Patriarch Gregory III, surnamed Mammis or Μammas (before ca. 1420 – 1459) was Ecumenical Patriarch within the Eastern Orthodox Church during the period 1443–1450. He was prominent in unsuccessful initiatives toward reunification with the Catholic Church.

Name
Few things are known about his life and his patriarchate. Not even his surname is certain, with the names Mammis or Mammas being probably mocking appellations. In the generally unreliable Chronicum Majus of George Sphrantzes, it is recorded that he came from Crete, and that his real name was Melissenos. In other works he is referred to as Melissenos-Strategopoulos.

Church career
He was tonsured as a monk in ca. 1420, and is considered to have been the confessor of Emperor John VIII Palaiologos. He was a supporter of the Union with the Roman Catholic Church. He played a very active role in the theological discussions. He participated in the preliminary negotiations with Rome at the Council of Basle and later accompanied Patriarch Joseph II to the Council of Ferrara-Florence, where he also represented Philotheus of Alexandria. He was elected Patriarch after the death of the also-unionist Patriarch Metrophanes II.

Gregory did his best to reconcile monks, the church hierarchy, and common people to the agreement reached at Ferrara-Florence, but in vain. He was opposed by George Scholarios and John Eugenikos, who wrote extensively against the council. Leading anti-Unionist clergy refused to pray for the Emperor in their churches. In 1450, the tension in ecclesiastical circles grew so tense that Gregory left his post and arrived in Rome in August 1451 (less than two years before the fall of Constantinople). He was cordially received by Pope Nicholas V, who aided him financially. Pro-unionists in the Latin-occupied areas of Greece continued to consider him the legitimate patriarch of Constantinople.

Legacy
Gregory died in 1459 in Rome. He was honoured as saint and wonder-worker by the Roman Catholic Church. He wrote two dissertations about the confutation of the works of the anti-unionist Bishop Mark Eugenikos, and one on the provenance of the Holy Spirit. Some of his letters have been preserved, while three further theological treatises, On the unleavened bread, On the Primacy of the Pope and On the Heavenly Beatitude, remain unpublished.

Further reading

Michel Cacouros, ‘Un patriarche à Rome, un katholikos didaskalos au patriarcat et deux donations trop tardives de reliques du seigneur: Grégoire III Mamas et Georges Scholarios, le synode et la synaxis’, in Byzantium State and Society: In Memory of Nikos Oikonomides, ed. Anna Avramea, Angeliki Laiou and E. Chrysos (Athens, 2003), pp. 71–124

Jonathan Harris, ‘The Patriarch of Constantinople and the last days of Byzantium’, in The Patriarchate of Constantinople in Context and Comparison, ed. Christian Gastgeber, Ekaterini Mitsiou, Johannes Preiser-Kapeller and Vratislav Zervan (Vienna: Österreichische Akademie der Wissenschaften, 2017), pp. 9–16. 978-3-7001-7973-3.

References

Sources
Ecumenical Patriarchate
GREGORY THE CONFESSOR

 

Converts to Eastern Catholicism from Eastern Orthodoxy
1459 deaths
Religious leaders from Crete
Greek Eastern Catholics
Latin Patriarchs of Constantinople
Former Greek Orthodox Christians
15th-century patriarchs of Constantinople
Year of birth unknown
Melissenos family
Year of birth uncertain